Visitors to Ethiopia must obtain a visa from one of the Ethiopian diplomatic missions unless they come from one of the visa exempt countries or countries whose citizens are eligible to apply for an electronic visa or visa on arrival.

Visa policy map

Visa exemption 

Citizens of the following 2 countries do not require a visa to visit Ethiopia:

Holders of diplomatic or service passports of any country other than Pakistan and Somalia do not require a visa for up to 3 months. Visa exemption agreements for holders of diplomatic and official/service passports were signed with Uganda and South Korea in August 2019 and with Indonesia in September 2019, and they are yet to be ratified.

Land Border Arrivals 

Visas are required for all visitors (except Kenya and Djibouti nationals) and they must be obtained from one of the Ethiopian diplomatic missions.

Visa on arrival 
(In the past) tourist visas (valid for up to 3 months) could only be issued at Addis Ababa Bole International Airport upon arrival to nationals of 93 countries and territories or to those holding a residence permit issued by those countries or territories.

Transit
Regardless of nationality, travelers in transit do not require a visa if they arrive by air, remain in the permitted transit area and depart within 12 hours.

eVISA
Ethiopia launched its own electronic visa platform on 12 June 2017. Citizens of all countries in the globe are eligible for tourist E visa.
 

Travelers with eVISA must enter Ethiopia via Addis Ababa Bole International Airport. Entering from other ports of entry is prohibited.

According to the eVISA website, as of November 18, 2020, credit card payment transactions are not accepted for applicants from the following countries and Crimea region of Ukraine.

See also
Visa requirements for Ethiopian citizens

References

External links
Ethiopia electronic visa

Ethiopia
Foreign relations of Ethiopia